Jeanne Marie Clark is an American internist and physician-scientist specializing in the epidemiology and treatment of obesity, type 2 diabetes and non-alcoholic fatty liver disease. She is a professor of medicine at the Johns Hopkins School of Medicine.

Life 
Clark earned a M.D. at the Robert Wood Johnson Medical School in 1992. She conducted a residency in internal medicine at the Dartmouth–Hitchcock Medical Center in 1996. Clark conducted fellowships at the Johns Hopkins School of Medicine in 1998 and 2000. She earned a M.P.H. at the Johns Hopkins Bloomberg School of Public Health.

Clark is a professor of medicine and director of the division of general internal medicine at the Johns Hopkins School of Medicine. She holds a joint appointment in epidemiology in the Johns Hopkins Bloomberg School of Public Health. Clark is also the executive director of the Brancati Center for the Advancement of Community Care. She researches the epidemiology and treatment of obesity and related conditions including type 2 diabetes and non-alcoholic fatty liver disease. Clark is a registered provider with the Florida Department of Health and perform telehealth appointments for Florida patients.

References 

Living people
Year of birth missing (living people)
Place of birth missing (living people)
Rutgers University alumni
21st-century American women physicians
21st-century American physicians
American internists
Women internists
Physician-scientists
American women epidemiologists
Obesity researchers
Johns Hopkins School of Medicine faculty
Johns Hopkins Bloomberg School of Public Health alumni